The Municipality of Bohinj is a municipality in the Upper Carniola region of northwest Slovenia. Its seat is the settlement of Bohinjska Bistrica. The municipality had 5,222 inhabitants in 2002.

Settlements
In addition to the municipal seat of Bohinjska Bistrica, the municipality includes the following settlements:

 Bitnje
 Bohinjska Češnjica
 Brod
 Goreljek
 Gorjuše
 Jereka
 Kamnje
 Koprivnik v Bohinju
 Laški Rovt
 Lepence
 Log v Bohinju
 Nemški Rovt
 Nomenj
 Podjelje
 Polje
 Ravne v Bohinju
 Ribčev Laz
 Savica
 Srednja Vas v Bohinju
 Stara Fužina
 Studor v Bohinju
 Ukanc
 Žlan

References

External links

 Municipality of Bohinj on Geopedia
 Bohinj municipal site (in Slovene)

 
Bohinj
1994 establishments in Slovenia